Line 12, also known as MetroSur (Spanish for MetroSouth), is a line of the Madrid Metro inaugurated on 11 April 2003. Line 12 is a circle line that is not in the city of Madrid, but links five suburban towns south of Madrid, serving around one million people. The towns linked by Line 12 are Alcorcón, Leganés, Getafe, Fuenlabrada and Móstoles. Despite parts of the line running through uninhabited territory, there are no above-ground sections in an effort to facilitate future urban development. At a total length of 40.6 km, it is the longest line in the network and even more extensive than Lines 9 and 10 with their appendages to the north and south. Despite this, Line 12 accumulated only about 32 million trips in 2018, down from 34.8 million in the previous year, making it the only line to lose users in that time and the third least used after the yet-to-be-completed Line 11 and the airport connection Line 8. This decrease was mainly caused by renovation works necessitating the temporary closure of sections of the line.

Stations

Existing
Line 12 stations have elements of art, such as the murals in the Hospital Severo Ochoa Station honoring the Nobel Prize winning biochemist, Severo Ochoa. Surface level stations are covered by massive roofs, with some glass to allow daylight -  a similar system is used in Copenhagen Metro and Prague Metro systems.

Proposed
There are plans to build two new stations: Fuenlabrada Oeste between Loranca and Hospital de Fuenlabrada, and secondly Fuenlabrada Este between Arroyo Culebro and Parque de los Estados. No completion dates for these new stations have been given, as they are still in the planning stage.

Rolling stock
Line 12 uses CAF's 8000 and AnsaldoBreda's 9000 series in MRM composition. Both series use 3-car train, as there is not enough demand, up to three extra coaches per train can be ordered

See also
 Madrid
 Transport in Madrid
 List of Madrid Metro stations
 List of metro systems

References

External links

  Madrid Metro (official website)
 Schematic map of the Metro network – from the official site 
 Madrid at UrbanRail.net
 ENGLISH User guide, ticket types, airport supplement and timings
 Network map (real-distance)
 Madrid Metro Map

12
Railway loop lines
Railway lines opened in 2003
2003 establishments in Spain